Juunin Toiro (十人十色 / Ten People, Ten Colors) is the eighth domestic single release by pop/rock artist misono. The single peaked at #21 on the Oricon charts, but dropped in rank to take the #47 slot for the week.

The single became her second in her Rock Singles Project, a project in which she released four different rock-themed singles with four different Japanese rock bands. For this single, she worked with GO!GO!7188, who performed the music, written by their vocalist Yumi Nakashima.

Background information
Juunin Toiro is the second single released by Japanese soloist misono for her Rock Singles Project, the first being Zasetsu Chiten. For the project, misono performed four rock-themed singles with four different Japanese rock groups. For this single, misono worked with GO!GO!7188, which was formed by Shoyo High School alumnae Yumi Nakashima and Akiko Hamada in 1998.

This single debuted at #21 on the Oricon Singles Charts, but dropped in rank to take #47 for the weekly ranking. As with Zasetsu Chiten, the single remained on the charts for two consecutive weeks. Juunin Toiro was released in two editions, CD and CD+DVD. The CD contained the title track, along with the b-side "GizaGiza Life" (ギザギザLIFE / Jagged Life) and the corresponding instrumentals. The DVD carried the music video for "Juunin Toiro," video commentary by misono and the television commercials for the single.

Both "Juunin Toiro" and "GizaGiza Life" were written by GO!GO!7188's vocalist and musical composer Yumi Nakashima, while the songs were performed by the band. misono, however, wrote the lyrics herself. "Juunin Toiro"'s title and theme were based on the Japanese proverb "Juunin toiro," which means "ten people, ten colors." The meaning being that everyone is different and has a different story. The saying comes from the Japanese word for "ten" (Juu / 十) combined with the word for "person" (nin / 人); "iro" (色) in "toiro" is the Japanese word for "color."

misono would later release all four songs in the project into one melody on her album Say -sei-.

Music video
To tie into the saying, the music video for "Juunin Toiro" followed the lives of ten different people, all incarnations of misono.

The main character is a young woman reading about the lives of the others through various-colored books. Incarnations include a woman in an abusive relationship, one who gets into a fight with their friend, a woman who is found cheating with her boyfriend and a rock musician. Throughout the video, the various characters sing about their lives. The music video goes on to show both the happy and ugly sides of people, showing not to judge people because you "don't know their experiences."

Track listing

Charts
Oricon Sales Chart (Japan)

References

External links
misono Official Site
GO!GO!7188 Official Site

2007 singles
2007 songs
Misono songs
Avex Trax singles
Songs written by Misono